Mexicana Universal Oaxaca is a pageant in Oaxaca, Mexico, that selects that state's representative for the national Mexicana Universal pageant.

In 2000, 2001, 2002, 2003, 2004, 2005, 2006 and 2007 was not sent to a State Representative.

The State Organization hasn't had a national winner in Nuestra Belleza México.

Titleholders
Below are the names of the annual titleholders of Mexicana Universal Oaxaca, listed in ascending order, and their final placements in the Mexicana Universal after their participation, until 2017 the names was Nuestra Belleza Oaxaca..

 Competed in Miss Universe.
 Competed in Miss International.
 Competed in Miss Charm International.
 Competed in Miss Continente Americano.
 Competed in Reina Hispanoamericana.
 Competed in Miss Orb International.
 Competed in Nuestra Latinoamericana Universal.

Designated Contestants

External links
Official Website

Nuestra Belleza México
Mexican awards